The Phoenix Theatre has presented productions since 1983. An Equity house, the Phoenix presents the Midwest and Indiana premieres of many Broadway and Off-Broadway plays, and has presented 94 World Premieres (through the end of the 2014–15 season). In May 2018, the Phoenix moved to a newly constructed, 20,000 square foot building, the Phoenix Theatre Cultural Centre, at 705 N. Illinois St. in the heart of downtown Indianapolis with two stages: the 144 seat Steve and Livia Russell Theatre and a flexible blackbox space, the Frank and Katrina Basile Theatre (capacity of 90). At its previous location at 749 N. Park Ave. in downtown Indianapolis near Massachusetts Avenue, the Phoenix operated a 130-seat proscenium style Mainstage and 75-seat downstairs cabaret.

It was founded by Bryan D. Fonseca in 1983, initially to perform the three-part (three evening) science fiction play, Warp!. Both venues are housed along with administrative offices in a renovated 1907 church where Jim Jones once preached, a fact that was brought into their production of Hedwig and the Angry Inch. The Phoenix Theatre is a member of the National New Play Network and the League of Indianapolis Theatres, and is supported by the Indiana Arts Commission, the Arts Council of Indianapolis, and the National Endowment for the Arts, as well as local corporate and foundation funders and more than 400 individual donors.

The Phoenix typically produces 10-12 shows per season, which most production being local regional premieres. They mostly produce plays written within the previous five years, and rarely produce shows more than one time (exceptions are Avenue Q and The Zippers of Zoomerville). Shows produced by the Phoenix are always issue-oriented, hoping to incite conversation along with the entertainment. They have often featured plays dealing with sexuality, homosexuality, women's issues, AIDS, African-American issues (they have done all of August Wilson's plays as they became available for regional theatre use), abuse, and mental disorders. The Phoenix is committed to hiring local artists, and almost all of their talent pool of designers and actors comes from Indianapolis or nearby cities.

Bryan Fonseca

Bryan Fonseca is the founding and former Producing Director of the Phoenix Theatre. (He was replaced in June 2018 ). He has played a role in the Indianapolis theatre community since 1979. Prior to the Phoenix, Bryan served as the artistic director for the Broad Ripple Playhouse and developed a short-lived alternative stage at the Indianapolis Booth Tarkington Civic Theatre – Studio C. Bryan has received an Achievement and Service award from the Indiana Theatre Association, two Artist Fellowship awards from the Indiana State Arts Commission and two Creative Renewal Fellowships from the Arts Council of Indianapolis/Lilly Endowment. Over the years, he transferred six Phoenix shows to Chicago including his original concert production, Prine: A Tribute Concert, which was performed at the Viaduct Theatre. Following his departure from the Phoenix, Fonseca founded the Fonseca Theatre Company on Indianapolis’ near west side. Fonseca died of complications from the COVID-19 virus in September 2020.

A Very Phoenix Xmas

The Phoenix produced an annual holiday show called A Very Phoenix Xmas from 2005 to 2019 curated by Producing Director Bryan Fonseca. The show featured original holiday-themed sketch comedy, musical numbers, dances, and variety acts (such as an aerial silk act) created but local and national playwrights.

Brew-Ha-Ha

In 1995, the Phoenix founded the original craft beer festival in Indianapolis, Brew-Ha-Ha, as a non-traditional fundraiser for the theatre. The outdoor block party took place just outside the Phoenix on the 700 block of N. Park Ave. between Massachusetts Ave. and E. St. Clair St. in the Mass Ave Arts & Theatre District. The final Brew-Ha-Ha was held in June 2018.

National New Play Network

The Phoenix is a Member of National New Play Network (NNPN), the country's alliance of non-profit professional theaters that supports the development, production, and continued life of new plays. Since its founding in 1998, NNPN has commissioned 19 playwrights, provided more than 20 MFA graduates with paid residencies, and supported over 150 productions nationwide through its Continued Life of New Plays Fund, which creates "Rolling World Premieres" of new plays. Hundreds of artists have gained employment through these efforts all over the country where NNPN Member Theatres are located. In addition to The Andrew W. Mellon Foundation, NNPN receives support from the Doris Duke Charitable Foundation, the Harold and Mimi Steinberg Charitable Trust, the Shubert Foundation, and the National Endowment for the Arts. The Network consists of a relatively small group of 29 Core Members, who pioneer and implement collaborative new play strategies, and a growing group of Associate Members, who disseminate the Network's programs and strategies nationwide. In April 2015, NNPN received the Washington Post Award for Innovative Leadership at the annual Helen Hayes Award Celebration.

Production history
(*=world premiere production)
(**=NNPN Rolling World Premiere)

1980s
1983-1984

WARP! I,II, & III by Stuart Gordon & Bury St. Edmond
Talking With… by Jane Martin
Krapp's Last Tape by Samuel Beckett
How I Got That Story by Amlin Gray
Plenty by David Hare
Lemonade by James Prideaux
Cloud Nine by Caryl Churchill
Summer Lights* by Sam Smiley
Escapes* by David Stooks
The Legs on Charlie's Car* by John Sarno
Necessities* by Kathy Fletcher & Rita Kohn
Sour Noodles* by Jim Watt

1984-1985

Agnes of God by John Pielmeier
Crimes of the Heart by Beth Henley
The Lion in Winter by James Goldman
Baby With the Bathwater by Christopher Durang
March of the Falsettos by William Finn
Dear John* by Marcia Cebulska
True West by Sam Shepard
Taking Steps by Alan Ayckbourn
The Call* by Bruce Gelfand
My Hand is Not My Heart* by Jack Randall Earles
Prep Work* by Bruce Gelfand
Porch Songs* by Pearl Cleage
…And Stuff* by Peter Dee

1985-1986

Stage Struck by Simon Gray
Balm in Gilead by Lanford Wilson
El Grande de Coca-Cola by House, Andrews, Shearman, Willis, & White
As Is by William F. Hoffman
A Soldier's Play by Charles Fuller
Accidental Death of an Anarchist by Dario Fo
Waiting for the Parade by John Murrell
The Madness of Lady Bright by Lanford Wilson
Days of our Dumping* by D.J.L. Neruda
Don't Crush that Dwarf, Hand Me the Pliers by Firesign Theatre
The Lesson by Eugène Ionesco
Centaurs* by Marcia Cebulska
Night Commander* by Silas Jones
Replay* by Bruce MacDonald
Prairie Sunset* by Richard Sutherland

1986-1987

The Threepenny Opera by Bertolt Brecht & Kurt Weill
*Orphans by Lyle Kessler
The Real Thing by Tom Stoppard
Ma Rainey's Black Bottom by August Wilson
Shivaree by William Mastrosimone
Hurlyburly by David Rabe
Hair by Gerome Ragni, James Rado, & Galt MacDermot
Dreams* by Nell Weatherwax
Pumpkin Pie, Sweet Potato Pie, and Other Cultural Differences by Various Poets
Cowboy Mouth by Sam Shepard
Nice People Dancing to Good Country Music by Lee Blessing
Grendel!* by John Gardner & Bart Simpson 
Spell #7 by Ntozake Shange
Rap Master Ronnie by Garry Trudeau & Elizabeth Swados
Not Funny* by Douglas Anderson
Caril & Charlie* by Gram Slaton
Ken's Brain* by Jim Mitchell

1987-1988

Execution of Justice by Emily Mann
…and when the bough breaks* by Marcia Cebulska
Loot by Joe Orton
Advice to the Players by Bruce Bonafede
Sister Mary Ignatius Explains It All for You by Christopher Durang
A Lie of the Mind by Sam Shepard
Savage/Love and Tongues by Sam Shepard
A…My Name is Alice by Joan Micklin Silver & Julianne Boyd
Chug by Ken Jenkins
Graceland by Ellen Byron
The House of Blue Leaves by John Guare
Cards & Beer* by Jack Randall Earles
Rebels* by Gary Williams & Steven Ridenour
Nightbreath* by Dennis Clontz

1988-1989

Steel Magnolias by Robert Harling
Miss Margarida's Way by Roberto Athayde
Bouncers by John Godber
Dreamgirls by Tom Eyen & Harry Krieger
Laughing Wild by Christopher Durang
Frankie and Johnny in the Clair de Lune by Terrence McNally
Coastal Disturbances by Tina Howe
Beach Party Nuclear Protest* by Jack Randall Earles & David Meek
Lloyd's Prayer by Kevin Kling
Aunt Dan & Lemon by Wallace Shawn
Three Guys Naked from the Waist Down by Jerry Colker & Michael Rupert
Mr. Right and Other Stories* by Linda Carson
Mortal Risk* by Ron Marks

1989-1990

Burn This by Lanford Wilson
Beirut by Alan Bowne
The Day Room by Don DeLillo
Here I Am* by David Meek (cabaret)
On the Verge (or The Geography of Yearning) by Eric Overmyer
Some Things You Need to Know Before the World Ends (A Final Evening with the Illuminati) by Larry Larson & Levi Lee
The Rocky Horror Show by Richard O'Brien
Fences by August Wilson
The Marriage of Bette and Boo by Christopher Durang
The Boys Next Door by Tom Griffin
Su Me* by Su Ours (cabaret)
Boy's Life by Howard Korder
Stiff Cuffs* by Christina Cocek & John DiAguino
Elizabeth/Regina* by Linda Carson

1990s
1990-1991

Eastern Standard by Richard Greenberg
T-Bone And Weasel by Jon Klein
Split Second by Dennis McIntyre
Vampire Lesbians of Sodom by Charles Busch
Reckless by Craig Lucas
Eleemossynary by Lee Blessing
One Mo' Time by Vernel Bagneris
Kennedy's Children by Robert Patrick
Roosters by Milcha Sanchez-Scott
Woman in Mind by Alan Ayckbourn
The Mystery of Irma Vep by Charles Ludlum
Lady & the Clarinet by Michael Cristopher
Dorothy Parker-A Symptom Recital* by Leo P. Carusone
Dragon Slayers* by William Rough

1991-1992

Other People's Money by Jerry Sterner
Lady Day at Emerson's Bar & Grill by Lanie Robertson
Square One by Steve Tesich
The Cemetery Club by Ivan Menchell
Only Kidding! by Jim Gehoghan
4 AM America by Ping Chong
Christmas on Mars by Harry Kondoleon
The Heidi Chronicles by Wendy Wasserstein
Angry Housewives by A.M. Collins & Chad Henry
Joe Turner's Come and Gone by August Wilson
The Lisbon Traviata by Terrence McNally
Womandingo* by Sterling Houston & Arnold Aprill
Objects in the Mirror are Closer than They Appear* by Lester Purley & Mark Cryer
hip my heart* by Paulette Licitra

1992-1993

M Butterfly by David Henry Hwang
Dorothy Parker-A Symptom Recital* by Leo P. Carusone
Lips Together, Teeth Apart by Terrence McNally
The Promise by Jose Rivera
Assassins by Stephen Sondheim & John Weidman
Sight Unseen by Donald Margulies
The Piano Lesson by August Wilson
Blind Spot* by Michael Davis Sutton
Candy Store Window* by Cherie Bennett

1993-1994

The Good Times Are Killing Me by Lynda Barry
Six Degrees of Separation by John Guare
Su Ours: No E, No H, Noel* by Su Ours & Michael Klass (cabaret)
Marvin's Room by Scott McPherson
Death & the Maiden by Ariel Dorfman
Three Ways Home by Casey Kurtti
Mama Drama by Leslie Ayvazian, Christine Farrell, Donna Dailey, Mariana Houston, Rita Nactmann, & Anne O'Sullivan
Pretty Girls, Not too Bright* by Dos Fallopia (Peggy Platt & Lisa Koch)
Heart Timers* by Stuart Warmflash
Veronica's Position* by Rich Orloff

1994-1995

Falsettos by William Finn & James Lapine
Keely and Du by Jane Martin
Five Guys Named Moe by Clarke Peters
Conversations With My Father by Herb Gardener
All in the Timing by David Ives
Jeffrey by Paul Rudnick
Bewitched, Bothered & Bananas* by Dos Fallopia (Lisa Koch & Peggy Platt)
Points of Deviation* by Scott Sandoe
Scotland Road by Jeffery Hatcher

1995-1996

The Search for Signs of Intelligent Life in the Universe by Jane Wagner
If We Are Women by Joanna Glass
The Holiday Survival Game Show* by Dos Fallopia (Lisa Koch & Peggy Platt)
Six Women with Brain Death by Mark Houston
Denial of the Fittest by Judith Sloan & Warren Leher
Love! Valour! Compassion! by Terrence McNally
Spike Heels by Theresa Rebeck
Glengarry Glen Ross by David Mamet
Pretty Girls, Not too Bright* by Dos Fallopia (Lisa Koch & Peggy Platt)
The Katydid* by Michael Davis Sutton

1996-1997

Whoop-Dee-Doo! by Howard Crabtree
Three Viewings by Jeffery Hatcher
The Holiday Survival Game Show* by Peggy Platt, Rick Rankin, & Lisa Koch
A Tuna Christmas by Ed Howard, Joe Sears, & Jaston Williams
Florida * by Marcia Cebulska
Trick the Devil by Bill Harris
Sylvia by AR Gurney
All I Really Needed to Know I Learned in Kindergarten by Ernest Zulia, David Caldwell, & Robert Fulghum
Worst of Dos Fallopia* by Dos Fallopia (Peggy Platt & Lisa Koch)
Reading the Mind of God * by Pat Gabridge
Girl Party * by David Dillion & Virginia Smiley

1997-1998

The Old Settler by John Henry Redwood
Poor Super Man by Brad Fraser
The Holiday Survival Game Show* by Jack O'Hara
Summer Games* by James Farrell
Taking Sides by Ronald Harwood
Durang/Durang by Christopher Durang
Company by Stephen Sondheim & George Furth
latitude* by Tony McDonald
Party by David Dillon
Bride of Dos Fallopia* by Dos Fallopia (Peggy Platt & Lisa Koch)
Princess Warrior by Julie Goldman

1998-1999

Angels in America: Millennium Approaches by Tony Kushner
Angels in America: Perestroika by Tony Kushner
The Holiday Survival Game Show* by Jack O'Hara
How I Learned to Drive by Paula Vogel
Mother Russia* by Jeffrey Hatcher
No Way to Treat a Lady by Douglas J. Cohen
Shakin the Mess Outta Misery by Shay Youngblood
Gross Indecency: The Three Trials of Oscar Wilde by Moisés Kaufman
The Gene Pool by Christi Stewart-Brown
As Bees in Honey Drown by Douglas Carter Beane
Lisa Koch and Friends* by Lisa Koch
Touch* by Toni Press-Coffman

1999-2000

Three Days of Rain by Richard Greenberg
The Woman in Black by Stephen Mallatratt
The Most Fabulous Story Ever Told by Paul Rudnick
The Holiday Millennium Game Show* by Jack O'Hara
Jackie: An American Life by Gip Hoppe
The Beauty Queen of Leenane by Martin McDonagh
Wit by Margaret Edson
Beautiful Thing by Jonathan Harvey
Journal of Ordinary Thought by David Barr
Resident Alien by Stuart Spencer

2000s
2000-2001

Snakebit by David Marshall Grant
The Gathering by Will Power
Tongue of a Bird by Ellen McLaughlin
The Santaland Diaries by David Sedaris
Uh, Oh - Here Comes Christmas by Ernie Zulia, David Caldwell
Bluff by Jeffrey Sweet
The Vagina Monologues by Eve Ensler
Fuddy Meers by David Lindsey Abaire
Another American: Asking and Telling by Marc Wolf
Bodies and Hearts in the Face of the Monster* by Toni Press-Coffman
Woody and Me* by Brad Erickson
Seven Guitars by August Wilson

2001-2002

The Laramie Project by Moisés Kaufman
Two Trains Running by August Wilson
Ham for the Holidays by Dos Fallopia (Lisa Koch & Peggy Platt)
Dirty Blonde by Claudia Shear
This is our Youth by Kenneth Lonergan
True to Scale* by Wendy Beldon
savant* by Tony McDonald
Goats* by Alan Berks
Born to Goof* by Kevin Burke
Lunching by Alan Gross
Bat Boy: The Musical by Keythe Farley, Brian Flemming, & Laurence O'Keefe
The Action Against Sol Schumann by Jeffrey Sweet

2002 - 2003

Proof by David Auburn
Flow by Will Power
Hedwig and the Angry Inch by Stephen Trask & John Cameron Mitchell - starring Blaine Hogan, Jessica Benge, Jimmy Sizemore, Royston Lloyd, Steve Hayes and Ryan
Over the Tavern by Tom Dudzick
Praying for Rain by Robert Lewis Vaughan
Stones in his Pockets by Marie Jones
The Washington-Sarajevo Talks by Carla Seaquist
The Home Team* by Kim Carney
La Sangre Llama* by Toni Press-Coffman & Tony Artis
Phideas8* by Mike Whistler
Spain by Jim Knable
The Handler by Robert Schenkkan

2003-2004

The Goat, or Who is Sylvia? by Edward Albee
Trucker Rhapsody* by Toni Press-Coffman
Circumference of a Squirrel by John Walch
Sophie Tucker: American Legend by Jack Fournier & Kathy Halenda
Boston Marriage by David Mamet
Curanderas by Elaine Romero
Loving Lucy by Philip blue owl Hooser
Take Me Out by Richard Greenberg
Top Dog/Underdog by Suzan-Lori Parks
Naked Boys Singing! by Robert Schrock
And/Or* by Andrew Barrett

2004-2005

The Exonerated by Jessica Blank & Erik Jensen
Crowns by Regina Taylor
Mrs. Bob Cratchit's Wild Christmas Binge by Christopher Durang
Running With Scissors by Michael McKeever
Blown Sideways Through Life by Claudia Shear
Frozen by Bryony Lavery
This Is My Body by Amy Fortoul
Rounding Third by Richard Dresser
Cabfare for the Common Man* by Mark Harvey Levine
Further Mo''' by Vernel BagnerisBug by Tracy Letts

2005-2006Urinetown: the Musical by Greg Kotis & Mark HollmannI Am My Own Wife by Doug WrightEvery Christmas Story Ever Told!! by Michael Carleton, John Alvarez, & Jim FitzgeraldA Number by Caryl Churchill
From My Hometown conceived by Lee Summers and written by Lee Summers, Ty Stephens, & Herbert Rawlings, Jr.The Marijuana-logues by Arj Barker, Doug Benson, & Tony CaminOrson's Shadow by Austin PendletonThe Pillowman by Martin McDonaghThe Sugar Bean Sisters by Nathan SandersThe Ice-Breaker** by David Rambo

2006-2007The Musical of Musicals (The Musical!) by Eric Rockwell & Joanne BogartNijinsky's Last Dance by Norman AllenThe Parenting Project: Callie's Tally by Betsy Howie & The Hoosier Dads by Kevin Burke, Dave Dugan, & Brad TassellA Very Phoenix Xmas* by Various ArtistsTen Percent of Molly Snyder (Marta Solano) by Richard StrandtempOdyssey** by Dan DietzMiss Witherspoon by Christopher DurangRhythms by Chris White (hosted... presented by DePauw University)And Her Hair Went With Her** by Zina CamblinFat Pig by Neil LaButeThe Little Dog Laughed by Douglas Carter BeaneDos Fallopia: Desperate Spuddwives by Lisa Koch and Peggy Platt

2007-2008Altar Boyz Music, lyrics and vocal arrangements by Gary Adler and Michael Patrick Walker, book by Kevin Del Aguila - based on an idea by Ken Davenport and Marc KesslerStuff Happens by David HareA Very Phoenix Xmas* by Various ArtistsEnd Days** by Deborah Zoe LauferThe Lieutenant of Inishmore by Martin McDonaghWell by Lisa KronBlack Gold** by Seth RozinOur Dad Is In Atlantis by Javier MalpicaSome Men by Terrence McNallyMurderers by Jeffrey Hatcher

2008-2009November by David MametDrunk Enough to Say I Love You? by Caryl Churchill
June 8, 1968 by Anna Theresa CascioOn Thin Ice: A Very Phoenix Xmas 3* by Various ArtistsLove Person** by Aditi Brennan KapilThe Seafarer by Conor McPhersonMauritius by Theresa RebeckReferences to Salvador Dalí Make Me Hot by José RiveraThe Zippers of Zoomerville - or 200 Laps and a Lass* by Jack O'Hara with music by Jack O'Hara and Tim BrickleyOctopus by Steven YockeyThe Dos and Don'ts of Time Travel by Nicholas Wardigo

2009-2010The Most Damaging Wound by Blair SingerShipwrecked! An Entertainment by Donald MarguliesA Very Phoenix Xmas 4:Our Stockings Are Stuffed* by Various ArtistsThe Housewives of Mannheim by Alan BrodyCall Me Boricua!* by Ricardo MelendezSunlight** by Sharr WhiteYankee Tavern by Steven DietzSpeech and Debate by Stephen KaramReasons to Be Pretty by Neil LaBute

2010s
2010-2011In the Next Room - Or the Vibrator Play by Sarah RuhlMy Name Is Asher Lev by Aaron Posner, adapted from the novel by Chaim PotokA Very Phoenix Xmas 5: Regifted* by Various ArtistsNorway by Samuel D. HunterGoldie, Max, and Milk by Karen HartmanThe Storytelling Ability of a Boy by Carter W. LewisThis by Melissa James GibsonThe Zippers of Zoomerville by Jack O'Hara with music by Jack O'Hara and Tim BrickleyAvenue Q Music, lyrics and original concept by Robert Lopez and Jeff Marx, book by Jeff WhittyWith a Bang by Pete McElliott

2011 - 2012Spring Awakening Music by Duncan Sheik, lyrics and book by Steven SaterJericho** by Jack Canfora A Very Phoenix Xmas 6: Our Goose Is Cooked* by various artistsCurrent Economic Conditions* by Don ZolidisAugust: Osage County by Tracy LettsFreud's Last Session by Mark St. GermainBaktun 13 by Danel MalanForever Sung* by Bryan Fonseca and Tim BrickleyNext Fall by Geoffrey NaufftsWith a Whimper by Pete McElligott

2012-2013Bloody, Bloody Andrew Jackson Music and lyrics written by Michael Friedman, Book by Alex TimbersSeminar by Theresa RebeckA Very Phoenix Xmas 7: Getting Figgy with It* by Various ArtistsGuapa** by Caridad SvichNext to Normal Book and lyrics by Brian Yorkey, Music by Tom KittThe Lyons by Nicky SilverClybourne Park by Bruce Norris4000 Miles by Amy HerzogDos Fallopia* by Lisa Koch and Peggy PlattLove, Loss, and What I Wore by Nora and Delia Ephron, based on the book by Ilene Beckerman

2013-2014Vanya, Sonia, Masha, and Spike by Christopher DurangRancho Mirage** by Stephen DietzA Very Phoenix Xmas 8: Angels We Have Heard While High* by Various ArtistsTribes by Nina RaineNorth of the Boulevard by Bruce GrahamI and You** by Lauren GundersonSpun by Emily GoodsonBless Me, Ultima by Rudolfo AnayaCock by Mike BartlettMiles and Ellie by Don Zolidis

2014-2015Clark Gable Slept Here by Michael McKeever Old Jews Telling Jokes by Peter Gethers and David OkrentA Very Phoenix Xmas 9: Flashing Through the Snow* by Various ArtistsRiver City** by Diana GrisantiThe Cripple of Inishmaan by Martin McDonaghBuyer and Cellar by Jonathan TolinsDontrell, Who Kissed the Sea** by Nathan Alan DavisTyphoid Mary* by Tom HoranAmerican Idiot Lyrics by Billie Joe Armstrong, book by Billie Joe Armstrong and Michael MayerMr. Burns, a Post-Electric Play by Anne Washburn

2015-2016One Man, Two Guvnors by Richard BeanThe Nether by Jennifer HaleyA Very Phoenix Xmas X: Oh, Come Let Us Adore Us* by Various ArtistsButler by Richard StrandPulp** by Joe ZettelmaierOn Clover Road** by Steven DietzLeyenda* by Playwright-in-Residence Tom Horan and Bryan FonsecaBook of Merman by Leo SchwartzAcid Dolphin Experiment*  by Playwright-in-Residence Tom Horan

2016-2017An Act of God by David JaverbaumDogs of Rwanda* by Sean Christopher LewisThe Golem of Havana by Michel HausmannHow to Use a Knife* by Will SniderHuman Rites by Amélie NothombThe Open Hand by Robert CaisleyPeter and the Starcatcher by Rick EliceSex with Strangers by Laura EasonStatic*  by Playwright-in-Residence Tom HoranA Very Phoenix Xmas XI* by Various Artists

2017-2018Barbecue by Robert O'HaraCry it Out by Molly Smith MetzlerFairfield by Eric CobleFun Home music by Jeanine Tesori, book and lyrics by Lisa KronHalftime with Don* by Ken WeitzmanIndecent by Paula VogelGod Bless You Mr. Rosewater by Kurt VonnegutSweat by Lynn NottageThe Pill  by Playwright-in-Residence Tom HoranA Very Phoenix Xmas XII* by Various Artists

2018-2019Apples in Winter* by Jennifer FawcettBright Star written and composed by Steve Martin and Edie BrickellCabaret Poe by Ben AsaykweeThe Children by Lucy KirkwoodThe Christians by Lucas HnathHotel Nepenthe by John KuntzWhite City Murder by Ben AsaykweeA Very Phoenix Xmas XIII* by Various Artists

2019-2020The Agitators by Mat SmartThe Legend of Georgia McBride by Matthew LopezVino Veritas by David MacGregorA Very Phoenix Xmas XIV* by Various Artists

2020-2021This season was cancelled due to the COVID-19 pandemic.2021-2022Alabaster** by Audrey CefalyBakersfield Mist by Stephan SachsLove Bird by K.T. PetersonThe Magnolia Ballet* by Terry GuestNo AIDS, No Maids: Or, Stories I Can't Fuckin' Hear No More by Dee Dee BatteastPanther Women: An Army for the Liberation** by India Nicole Burton

2022-2023Tick, Tick...Boom! book, music, and lyrics by Jonathan LarsonThe Rise and Fall of Holly Fudge by Trista BaldwinWild Horses by Allison GregoryTwo Mile Hollow'' by Leah Nanako Winkler

References

External links
 The Phoenix Theatre Official Site

Tourist attractions in Indianapolis
Buildings and structures in Indianapolis
Theatre companies in Indiana
Theatres in Indiana
1983 establishments in Indiana